Mónica Torres is a Mexican taekwondo practitioner. 

She won a silver medal in finweight at the 1987 World Taekwondo Championships in Barcelona, after being defeated by Jang Eu-suk in the final. She won a silver medal in finweight at the 1989 World Taekwondo Championships, after being defeated by Chin Yu-fang in the final. She won a gold medal at the 1988 Pan American Taekwondo Championships, and a bronze medal in 1990.

References

External links

Year of birth missing (living people)
Living people
Mexican female taekwondo practitioners
World Taekwondo Championships medalists
Pan American Taekwondo Championships medalists
20th-century Mexican women